Aguas Blancas is a barrio in the municipality of Yauco, Puerto Rico. Its population in 2010 was 231.

History
Puerto Rico was ceded by Spain in the aftermath of the Spanish–American War under the terms of the Treaty of Paris of 1898 and became an unincorporated territory of the United States. In 1899, the United States Department of War conducted a census of Puerto Rico finding that the population of Aguas Blancas barrio was 1,170.

Geography 
The barrio is located in the Cordillera Central in northern Yauco, and the highest point of the municipality, at 2,864 ft (873 m) above sea level, is partially located in the boundary with the Duey and Sierra Alta barrios. Duey River also runs through and originates in this barrio.

Demographics

See also

 List of communities in Puerto Rico

References

Barrios of Yauco, Puerto Rico